Halifax Chebucto is a provincial electoral district in Nova Scotia, Canada, that elects one member of the Nova Scotia House of Assembly.

It is one of several ridings within the Halifax Regional Municipality. It encompasses the neighbourhood known informally as the West End. The economy consists mostly of military employment from CFB Halifax, the Queen Elizabeth II Health Science's Centre as well as retail stores on Quinpool Road.

The riding is one of the few in the province to have a long history of New Democratic Party (NDP) representation. It been represented by an NDP Member of the Legislative Assembly (MLA) for all but two terms since 1981. In the 2013 election, the Liberal candidate, Joachim Stroink was elected to represent the riding in the House of Assembly during the collapse of the NDP province-wide. However, the 2017 election saw the new leader of the NDP Gary Burrill elected, defeating Stroink after only one term.

The riding has produced two provincial NDP leaders, Alexa McDonough (who would go on to lead the federal NDP) and Burrill.

Members of the Legislative Assembly
This riding has elected the following MLAs:

Geography

Election results

1967 general election

1970 general election

1974 general election

1978 general election

1981 general election

1984 general election

1988 general election

1993 general election

1998 general election

1999 general election

2003 general election

2006 general election

2009 general election

2013 general election

|Liberal
|Joachim Stroink
|align="right"|4,352 
|align="right"|49.87
|align="right"|
|-

|New Democratic Party
|Gregor Ash
|align="right"|3,376 
|align="right"|38.68
|align="right"| 
|-

|Progressive Conservative
|Christine Dewell
|align="right"|874 
|align="right"|10.02
|align="right"|
|-

|Independent
|Michael Marshall 
|align="right"|125 
|align="right"|1.43
|align="right"|
|-
|}

2017 general election

2021 general election

References

External links
riding profile
 June 13, 2006 Nova Scotia Provincial General Election Poll By Poll Results

Nova Scotia provincial electoral districts
Politics of Halifax, Nova Scotia